Gando is a village in the commune of Bassila in the Donga Department of western Benin. It is located near the border with Togo.

External links
Satellite map at Maplandia

Populated places in the Donga Department
Commune of Bassila